The College of Science, Technology and Applied Arts of Trinidad and Tobago (COSTAATT) is a public, multi-campus college in Trinidad and Tobago, established in 2000.

References

External links 

Educational institutions established in 2000
Universities in Trinidad and Tobago
2000 establishments in Trinidad and Tobago